Ton Koot (1907–1986) was secretary of the Amsterdam Rijksmuseum. He was vice-president of the Amsterdam Tourist Office and a prolific author.  The Ton Kootpenning has been awarded since 1972 for services to the preservation of heritage and commitment to monument protection.

Selected publications
Before 1940 the subject of his publications was Scouting and camping, later the history and attractions of Amsterdam.

Dutch
 Volg het spoor : Een boek voor en over Nederlandse voortrekkers, N.V. Wereldbibliotheek, Amsterdam 1935 (With illustrations by Titus Leeser)
 Jamboree logboek 1937 : officieel gedenkboek, 1937
 En nu Amsterdam in! Zwerftochten in en rondom Amsterdam. 1941.
 Het Muiderslot, door Ton Koot, slotvoogd, Wereldbibliotheek, 1954.
 Dat was te Muden : Te Muden hadde de Grave staende een huys: Geschiedenis van het Muiderslot. Meijer Pers, Wormerveer, 1967.
 Amsterdam Übertragung aus dem Niederl. Knorr & Hirth, Munich & Hanover, 1968.
 Langs de Amsterdamse grachten. c. 1973.
 Amsterdam in Wintertooi. Baarn, Wereldvenster, 1975. 
 De glorie van Amsterdam. Elsevier, 1976.

English
 Rembrandt's Night Watch: Its history and adventures. J.M. Meulenhoff, Amsterdam; Cassell & Co., London; 1949
 Spell of the Netherlands. Boom-Ruygrok, Haarlem, 1952.
 Amsterdam as it is. Lankamp and Brinkman, 1955.

References

1907 births
1986 deaths
Curators from Amsterdam
Rijksmuseum Amsterdam
Dutch non-fiction writers
Writers from Amsterdam